Party Camp is an American comedy film released in 1987. The plot revolves around a teenager (Andrew Ross) who takes a job as a summer camp counselor, only to spend the whole experience partying and engaging in hijinks.

Plot
Camp counselor and party animal Jerry Riviera (Andrew Ross) has seen the girl of his dreams in Heather Morris (Kerry Brennan) at summer camp. Unfortunately, the strict regimen of his camp experience is not what he imagined. So, with the help of his group of young misfit campers, wiseguy Riviera sets out to buck authority and turn the experience into a non-stop party-like atmosphere.

References

External links 
 
 
 

1987 films
1980s sex comedy films
American sex comedy films
1980s English-language films
Films about summer camps
Teen sex comedy films
1987 comedy films
Films directed by Gary Graver
1980s American films